The All Ethiopian National Movement (abbreviated መኢብን, 'Meiben') is a political party in Ethiopia. Mesfin Shiferraw is the chairman of the party. The party was registered on June 3, 2005. The election symbol of the party is three fingers.

References

Political parties in Ethiopia